John Petts may refer to:

John Petts (artist) (1914–1991), Welsh artist
John Petts (footballer), English football player and manager